The 1871 New Jersey gubernatorial election was held on November 7, 1871. Democratic nominee Joel Parker defeated Republican nominee Cornelius Walsh with 51.88% of the vote.

General election

Candidates
Joel Parker, former Governor of New Jersey (Democratic)
Cornelius Walsh, trunk manufacturer (Republican)

Results

References

1871
1871 New Jersey elections
New Jersey
November 1871 events